David Wu Tai Wai (Chinese 胡大為; born Hong Kong, 1952) is a Hong Kong-Canadian editor, director, and actor of film and television, known for his collaborations with directors John Woo and Ronnie Yu. He is also the editor of several international cult classics such as A Chinese Ghost Story , Hard Boiled, Bride of Chucky and Brotherhood of the Wolf.

He has been nominated 12 times for the Hong Kong Film Award for Best Editing, winning twice for Hard Boiled (1992) and The Crossing (2014). He has also been nominated for several Directors Guild of Canada and Leo Awards.

Filmography

Actor
 Bitter Taste Of Blood 亡命天涯 1987
 A Chinese Ghost Story 倩女幽魂 1987
 Fatal Love 殺之戀 1988
 I Love Maria 1988
 Mother Vs Mother 南北媽打 1988
 Once A Thief  縱橫四海 1991
 Doctor Vampire 僵屍醫生 1990
 C'est La Vie, Mon Cheri 新不了情 1993
 Flying Dagger 神經刀與飛天貓 1993
 Killer's Love 兩廂情願 1993
 Master Wong VS Master Wong 黃飛鴻對黃飛鴻 1993
 A Roof With A View 天台的月光 1993
 Shadow Cop 神探乾濕褸 1993

Director
 The Bride with White Hair 2 白髮魔女2 (1993)
 Snow Queen 冰雪女王 (2002)
 Plague City: SARS in Toronto (2005)
 Merlin's Apprentice 聖杯傳說 (2006)
 Cold Steel (2011) (Chinese: 遍地狼煙 pinyin: Biandi Lang Yan)

References

External links

1952 births
Hong Kong male film actors
Canadian film directors
Living people
Asian-Canadian filmmakers